Harner is a surname. Notable people with the surname include:

Jason Butler Harner (born 1970), American actor
Joseph Gabriel Harner (1889–1958), United States Navy sailor and Medal of Honor recipient
Michael Harner (1929–2018), American animist

See also
Harner Homestead, historic house in West Virginia, United States